Julie & Carol: Together Again is a 1989 American musical comedy television special performed by Julie Andrews and Carol Burnett at the Pantages Theatre in Hollywood. It aired December 13, 1989 on ABC and was directed by Jeff Margolis.

Background
This event marked "25 years after Andrews' and Burnett's first music and comedy special in Carnegie Hall, 18 years since their last at Lincoln Center". Many of the crew had worked with the two on some of their previous projects, including producer-writers Ken and Mitzie Welch, costumer Bob Mackie, and musician-arranger Peter Matz.

Andrews said "The thought over the years, is that we would love to do a series of shows, starting here and then going on to 'Julie & Carol in London,' 'Julie and Carol in Paris,' maybe even in Moscow or at the Great Wall of China."

Contents
The show featured "reminiscences, a rap, an unconventional comic tea party, a medley, and a country-style "Phantom of the Opry." No dancers. No other singers. Just the two of them on stage together performing with a full orchestra."

One of the main themes is growing older.  The Morning Call noted: "Now in their mid-fifties, the women sensibly - and they are both sensible women - deal with middle age up front. No longer the young and adored toasts of Broadway as they were when they met - Andrews in "My Fair Lady" and Burnett in "Once Upon a Mattress" - they address motherhood and the other changes that time has brought."

Critical reception
The show has received highly positive reviews.

Awards

|-
| 1990
| Rene Lagler (production designer)
| Primetime Emmy Award for Outstanding Art Direction for a Variety or Music Program
| 
|-
| 1990
| Bob Mackie (costume designer)
| Primetime Emmy Award for Outstanding Costume Design for a Variety or Music Program
| 
|-
| 1990
| Kris Trexler (editor)
| Primetime Emmy Award for Outstanding Editing for a Miniseries or a Special - Multi-Camera Production
| 
|-
| 1990
| Carol Burnett 
| American Comedy Award for Funniest Female Performer in a TV Special (Leading or Supporting) Network, Cable or Syndication
| 
|}

References

1989 television specials
1980s American television specials
Music television specials
American Broadcasting Company television specials
Television shows directed by Jeff Margolis